The 1974 kidnapping of Jack Teich in Kings Point, New York, resulted in the largest ransom being paid in the United States up to that point. The subsequent criminal cases led to financial compensation and freedom for the primary suspect.

Teich was thirty-four years old when he was abducted in his driveway. After being held, bound in chains, tape, and handcuffs, in a closet in an undetermined location in the Bronx for seven days, he was released in exchange for a $750,000 ransom (nearly $4,078,500 in 2019). In 2013, this crime was listed as one of the most notorious crimes on Long Island. The Teich case was also cited in a 1975 New York Times article indicating kidnappings had increased over the previous ten years. Teich's older brother, Buddy, was the original target of the kidnapping.

Kidnapping 
Jack Teich (born February 3, 1940) was reported missing by his wife, Janet, on November 12, 1974, after he failed to return home from work. He had been abducted at gun point in his driveway in Kings Point. The kidnappers began contacting his family the following night and demanded $750,000 in exchange for his release. At the time, this was the largest ransom for a US-based kidnapping. The ransom was paid, with Teich's wife and brother following instructions to leave the money in a locker in Pennsylvania Station. Teich was released soon after, but the authorities lost sight of his captors during the retrieval. The FBI investigators indicated concern for his safety and that of others in the public area, and followed too far behind the individual they were pursuing.

Investigation 
Immediately after his release, up to four suspects were sought for their roles in the crime. They believed there was political motivation and that Teich was targeted for his wealth. During the week he was held, Teich was bound in chains and kept in a closet. His kidnappers frequently made anti-Semitic and anti-wealth comments and accusations, and threatened to rob him. Although he was told he was being taken to Harlem, it is believed he was held in the Bronx. Teich was told the money would “go out of the country to feed hungry people, Palestinians and poor blacks.”  Richard Williams was eventually tracked down and arrested in California in September 1976, where money tied to the ransom was used to buy groceries and supplies. Williams was found with $38,000 from the ransom money, in the walls of a mobile home he shared.

Trial 
The trial of Williams began in 1977 and ran for 14 weeks. Throughout the trial there were numerous delays brought by the defense. Daily newspaper coverage (Newsday) indicated frustration and allegations of undue delay voiced both by the defense (the defendant and defense attorney, Donald Kane) and Judge Alexander Vitale.

In July 1978, Williams was sentenced to fifteen years for each the conspiracy and the grand larceny charges. Those were to be served concurrently. He was also sentenced twenty-five years to life for the kidnapping.  At the time, Charles Berkley, who was a former employee of Teich's, was still sought as a second suspect.

Berkley was eventually found and charged in 1980; however, there was insufficient evidence to bring him to trial.

Post-trial events 
In January 1984, while still serving his sentence, Williams was awarded $35,501 in damages after his lawyer Fern Steckler successfully argued he was denied civil rights in 1976–1977.  He was awarded $25,000 for not receiving eyeglasses despite eye strain, $10,000 for being repeatedly handcuffed to other inmates for four to eight hours in smoke-filled courthouse detention cells, $500 for being harassed by a corrections officer, and $1 for not receiving a magazine subscription in a timely fashion.

In 1994, Williams’ conviction was overturned on the grounds that black jurors had been improperly dismissed. Although it was nearly 10 years after the trial, a 1986 US Supreme Court case (Batson v Kentucky) gave Williams’ open appeal a new avenue. Cases that had open appeals would fall under the 1986 ruling. Overruled by the judge in 1978, the defense objected to six peremptory challenges used to dismiss black prospective jurors from the panel. Later, the prosecution could find the explanation for only three of the six, and a panel found that insufficient to rule out a racial motivation.

In June 1997, Williams was released after Judge Frank Gulotta sentenced him to 6 2/3 to 20 years, the maximum being slightly less time than he had already served. Teich vowed at that 1997 hearing to continue seeking repayment through civil suit for trauma and the unrecovered ransom, for a sum of $2,000,000. To date, this has not been resolved.

Life after the kidnapping 
Teich remains active in his community and business. He continues his career with Acme Sales Group (formerly Acme Architectural Products Co, Inc.) and Whitehead Company LLC. In 2002 he was cited by the Hon. Nita Lowey on the floor of Congress for his philanthropic and business contributions.

The Teich kidnapping was included in James Patterson’s novel Along Came a Spider, published in 1993 and later made into a film starring Morgan Freeman.

In 2020, more than 45 years since the event, Teich published his memoir of the events entitled, Operation Jacknap: A True Story of Kidnapping, Extortion, Ransom, and Rescue.

See also
List of kidnappings
List of solved missing persons cases

References

External links 
Janssen, Sarah, The World Almanac and Book of Facts 2019 

1970s missing person cases
Formerly missing people
Kidnappings in the United States
Missing person cases in New York (state)
November 1974 events in the United States
1970s in New York (state)